Kalinovka may refer to:
Kalinovka, Hajigabul, a village in Azerbaijan
Kalinovka, Masally, a village in Azerbaijan
Kalinovka, Kazakhstan, a settlement in Almaty Province of Kazakhstan
Kalinovka, Russia, name of several rural localities in Russia
Kalynivka (disambiguation), several locations in Ukraine